Kika van Es (born 11 October 1991) is a Dutch professional footballer who plays as a defender for Eredivisie club PSV and the Netherlands national team.

Club career
She started her career at Olympia '18 and in 2008 moved to Willem II of the Eredivisie where she played for two seasons. In 2010, she signed with Eredivisie's newly created team VVV-Venlo and when the club dissolved in 2012, all its players were taken by another newly created team, PSV/FC Eindhoven to play in the BeNe League.

In 2016, she signed with Achilles '29. After one season with the club, she moved to FC Twente on 16 June 2017.

After Twente she played a year for Ajax before moving to England to play for Everton. 
In September 2020, van Es left Everton.

On 21 September it was announced that van Es had rejoined her former side FC Twente after two seasons away from the club.

International career

She is a member of the Netherlands women's national football team, making her debut on 21 November 2009 against Belarus. In June 2013 Van Es was among the last three players to be cut from national team coach Roger Reijners' Netherlands squad for UEFA Women's Euro 2013 in Sweden.

In 2017, Van Es was called up to be part of the team that participated in UEFA Women's Euro 2017. She started all 6 games for the team, and helped the team win the tournament.

Van Es was selected to the final squad for the 2019 FIFA Women’s World Cup in France.

Honours
Netherlands
UEFA Women's Euro: 2017
Algarve Cup: 2018
 FIFA Women's World Cup: 2019 runners-up

References

External links

 Van Es profile at women's football Netherlands
 Van Es profile at PSV/FC Eindhoven
 Profile  at Onsoranje.nl
 

1991 births
Living people
People from Boxmeer
Dutch women's footballers
Netherlands women's international footballers
Eredivisie (women) players
Women's Super League players
PSV (women) players
Willem II (women) players
VVV-Venlo (women) players
FC Twente (women) players
Everton F.C. (women) players
UEFA Women's Championship-winning players
Women's association football defenders
2019 FIFA Women's World Cup players
Dutch expatriate women's footballers
Dutch expatriate sportspeople in England
Expatriate women's footballers in England
Footballers at the 2020 Summer Olympics
Olympic footballers of the Netherlands
Footballers from North Brabant
UEFA Women's Euro 2017 players